The 2015 Júbilo Iwata season saw the club compete in the J2 League, the second-tier of Japanese football, in which they finished 2nd.

J2 League

League table

Match details

References

External links
 J.League official site

Júbilo Iwata
Júbilo Iwata seasons